Vas (or) is an administrative county (comitatus or vármegye) of Hungary. It was also one of the counties of the former Kingdom of Hungary. It is part of the Centrope Project.

Geography
Vas county lies in western Hungary. It shares borders with Austria (Burgenland) and Slovenia (Mura Statistical Region) and the Hungarian counties Győr-Moson-Sopron, Veszprém and Zala. The capital of Vas county is Szombathely. Its area is 3,336 km².

History

Vas is also the name of a historic administrative county (comitatus) of the Kingdom of Hungary. Its territory is now in western Hungary, eastern Austria and eastern Slovenia. The capital of the county was Szombathely.

Vas county arose as one of the first comitatus of the Kingdom of Hungary.

In 1920, by the Treaty of Trianon the western part of the county became part of the new Austrian land Burgenland, and a smaller part in the southwest, known as Vendvidék became part of the newly formed Kingdom of Serbs, Croats and Slovenes (later renamed to Yugoslavia). In the Vendvidék in 1919 was founded an unrecognized state the Prekmurje Republic, alike in Burgenland the Lajtabánság. The remainder stayed in Hungary, as the present Hungarian county Vas. After World War II due to Communist reforms, a small part of former Sopron county went to Vas county, some villages north of Zalaegerszeg went to Zala county, and a small region west of Pápa went to Veszprém county.

Since 1991, when Slovenia became independent from Yugoslavia, the Yugoslavian part of former Vas county (around Murska Sobota) is part of Slovenia.

The Vas county is home to a small Slovene minority, which lives in the area between the town of Szentgotthárd and the Slovenian border (see Hungarian Slovenes).

Demographics

In 2015, it had a population of 253,997 and the population density was 76/km².

Ethnicity
Besides the Hungarian majority, the main minorities are the Croats (approx. 3,000), Roma (2,500), Germans (2,000) and Slovenes (1,500).

Total population (2011 census): 256,629
Ethnic groups (2011 census):
Identified themselves: 225 052 persons:
Hungarians: 214 512 (95.32%)
Croats: 3 102 (1.38%)
Gypsies: 2 559 (1.14%)
Others and indefinable: 4 879 (2.17%)
Approx. 39,000 persons in Vas County did not declare their ethnic group at the 2011 census.

Religion

Religious adherence in the county according to 2011 census:

Catholic – 150,912 (Roman Catholic – 150,575; Greek Catholic – 276);
Evangelical – 15,135;
Reformed – 7,113; 
other religions – 2,087; 
Non-religious – 13,621; 
Atheism – 1,895;
Undeclared – 65,866.

Regional structure

Politics 

The Vas County Council, elected at the 2014 local government elections, is made up of 15 counselors, with the following party composition:

Presidents of the General Assembly

Municipalities 
Vas County has 1 urban county, 12 towns and 203 villages.

City with county rights
(ordered by population, as of 2011 census)
Szombathely (78,884) – county seat

Towns

 Sárvár (14,777)
 Körmend (11,950)
 Kőszeg (11,666)
 Celldömölk (11,113)
 Szentgotthárd (8,678)
 Vasvár (4,387)
 Vép (3,534)
 Bük (3,301)
 Csepreg (3,286)
 Répcelak (2,575)
 Jánosháza (2,529)
 Őriszentpéter (1,178)

Villages

 Acsád
 Alsószölnök
 Alsóújlak
 Andrásfa
 Apátistvánfalva
 Bajánsenye
 Balogunyom
 Bejcgyertyános
 Bérbaltavár
 Boba
 Borgáta
 Bozsok
 Bozzai
 Bögöt
 Bögöte
 Bő
 Bucsu
 Cák
 Chernelházadamonya
 Csákánydoroszló
 Csánig
 Csehi
 Csehimindszent
 Csempeszkopács
 Csénye
 Csipkerek
 Csönge
 Csörötnek
 Daraboshegy
 Dozmat
 Döbörhegy
 Döröske
 Duka
 Egervölgy
 Egyházashetye
 Egyházashollós
 Egyházasrádóc
 Felsőcsatár
 Felsőjánosfa
 Felsőmarác
 Felsőszölnök
 Gasztony
 Gencsapáti
 Gersekarát
 Gérce
 Gór
 Gyanógeregye
 Gyöngyösfalu
 Győrvár
 Halastó
 Halogy
 Harasztifalu
 Hegyfalu
 Hegyháthodász
 Hegyhátsál
 Hegyhátszentjakab
 Hegyhátszentmárton
 Hegyhátszentpéter
 Horvátlövő
 Horvátzsidány
 Hosszúpereszteg
 Ikervár
 Iklanberény
 Ispánk
 Ivánc
 Ják
 Jákfa
 Karakó
 Katafa
 Káld
 Kám
 Keléd
 Kemeneskápolna
 Kemenesmagasi
 Kemenesmihályfa
 Kemenespálfa
 Kemenessömjén
 Kemenesszentmárton
 Kemestaródfa
 Kenéz
 Kenyeri
 Kercaszomor
 Kerkáskápolna
 Kétvölgy
 Kisrákos
 Kissomlyó
 Kisunyom
 Kiszsidány
 Kondorfa
 Köcsk
 Kőszegdoroszló
 Kőszegpaty
 Kőszegszerdahely
 Lócs
 Lukácsháza
 Magyarlak
 Magyarmádalja
 Magyarszecsőd
 Magyarszombatfa
 Meggyeskovácsi
 Megyehíd
 Mersevát
 Mesterháza
 Mesteri
 Meszlen
 Mikosszéplak
 Molnaszecsőd
 Nagygeresd
 Nagykölked
 Nagymizdó
 Nagyrákos
 Nagysimonyi
 Nagytilaj
 Nádasd
 Nárai
 Narda
 Nemesbőd
 Nemescsó
 Nemeskeresztúr
 Nemeskocs
 Nemeskolta
 Nemesládony
 Nemesmedves
 Nemesrempehollós
 Nick
 Nyőgér
 Olaszfa
 Ostffyasszonyfa
 Oszkó
 Orfalu
 Ólmod
 Ölbő
 Őrimagyarósd
 Pankasz
 Pácsony
 Pápoc
 Pecöl
 Perenye
 Peresznye
 Petőmihályfa
 Pinkamindszent
 Pornóapáti
 Porpác
 Pósfa
 Pusztacsó
 Püspökmolnári
 Rábagyarmat
 Rábahídvég
 Rábapaty
 Rábatöttös
 Rádóckölked
 Rátót
 Répceszentgyörgy
 Rönök
 Rum
 Sajtoskál
 Salköveskút
 Sárfimizdó
 Sé
 Simaság
 Sitke
 Söpte
 Sorkifalud
 Sorkikápolna
 Sorokpolány
 Sótony
 Szaknyér
 Szakonyfalu
 Szalafő
 Szarvaskend
 Szatta
 Szeleste
 Szemenye
 Szentpéterfa
 Szergény
 Szőce
 Tanakajd
 Táplánszentkereszt
 Telekes
 Tokorcs
 Tompaládony
 Tormásliget
 Torony
 Tömörd
 Uraiújfalu
 Vasalja
 Vasasszonyfa
 Vasegerszeg
 Vashosszúfalu
 Vaskeresztes
 Vassurány
 Vasszécseny
 Vasszentmihály
 Vasszilvágy
 Vámoscsalád
 Vásárosmiske
 Vát
 Velem
 Velemér
 Viszák
 Vönöck
 Zsennye
 Zsédeny

Gallery

References

External links
 Official site in Hungarian and English
 Vas Népe (vaol.hu) - The county portal
Hungary at GeoHive

 
Counties of Hungary